Gao Feng may refer to:

 Gao Feng (Wentong) (高鳳), style name Wentong (文通), Eastern Han Dynasty hermit, see Book of the Later Han
 Gao Jifu (高季輔; 596–654), formal name Gao Feng (高馮), Tang Dynasty chancellor
 Gao Feng (footballer) (高峰; born 1971), former footballer
 Gao Feng (judoka) (高峰; born 1982), judoka
 Gao Feng (wrestler) (born 1986), freestyle wrestler